Secondary containment may refer to:

 Containment building, a type of building used with nuclear reactors
 Secondary spill containment, a technique for dealing with hazardous spills
 A possible requirement for chemical tanks